Stephen Nash (born ) is an English rugby league footballer who most recently played for the Swinton Lions in the Kingstone Press Championship.

He has previously played for Widnes, Salford, Leigh, Castleford (Heritage № 923), and the Swinton Lions.

References

External links
Profile at castigers.com

1986 births
Living people
Castleford Tigers players
Dewsbury Rams players
English rugby league players
Leigh Leopards players
Rugby league props
Rugby league second-rows
Salford Red Devils players
Swinton Lions players
Widnes Vikings players